Peter Zachary Gonzalez (born June 15, 1993), known professionally as Zack Peter, is an American comedian, podcast host, writer, and activist. He first received recognition for his advocacy work for autism awareness. He has published a total of four books with bylines for PopSugar and Men's Health. He is best known as the host of the podcast, #NoFilter with Zack Peter. The podcast regularly ranks in the Top Shows in TV & Film on Apple Podcasts, and has gained additional popularity on YouTube.

In 2022, he joined Spotify's The Ringer network as a pop-culture podcast host.

Early life 
Peter grew up in Los Angeles, CA. His mother's name is Nancy. She was a contestant on the Sci-Fi reality show Estate of Panic in the episode "Don't Burst My Bubble" in 2008 and was even pranked by Zack on Lifetime's Prank My Mom. He has a total of six siblings, two from his mother's side (Elijah Joeb and Ethan) and four from his father's side.

Career

Advocacy 
In March 2009, Peter organized and hosted the first Play Now for Autism event. The fundraiser was a sports clinic for children with autism. The event raised over $2,000 which was donated to help autism research. Zack says that he started Play Now for Autism in honor of his younger brother with autism, Ethan, also known as "Deets."

Following Play Now for Autism, he then began hosting an internet talk-radio show, "it's on with Zack." The show started in July 2009 and ended in December 2011. On the show, Peter interviewed guests active in the autism community, covered recent news, and hosted debates.

In October 2009, his first book, Saving Deets!: A Family's Journey with Autism was released, which was later re-released in November 2010.

His advocacy efforts continued with events like Laugh Now for Autism, Rock Now for Autism, and his work with Jenny McCarthy's autism foundation, Generation Rescue, which he became executive director of in 2018. After nearly 10 years with the foundation, he ended his term in the summer of 2019.

Comedy 
In 2011, Zack began performing stand-up, performing at a variety of clubs in Los Angeles, including the world-famous Laugh Factory and The Comedy Store. He even performed with comedians from Chelsea Handler's hit late-night talk show on E!, Chelsea Lately at the 2011 Laugh Now for Autism benefit show. "

He has written two books of humor essays, Charity Bites! and When Life Hands You Lemons. . . Throw Them At People!.

He hosted a short-lived YouTube series Just Plain Ridiculous with Zack and Ry from 2012 to 2013.

In April 2015, he began hosting #NoFilter with Zack Peter, a weekly entertainment podcast.

Literary 
Zack has authored and self-published three books: Saving Deets!: A Family's Journey with Autism, Charity Bites!: The Untold Stories of the Dog-Eat-Dog World of Autism Activism, and When Life Hands You Lemons. . . Throw Them At People: A Book About Growing Up, Screwing Up, and Moving Up, with Just an Ounce of Maturity. His first book was published when he was sixteen, and his third when he was nineteen.

He writing has also been featured on a variety of sites, including Conscious Magazine, POPSUGAR, and Men's Health.

His fourth book, A Shot Of Hope, was released in October 2014 with Skyhorse Publishing, and later sold to Simon and Schuster.

Podcasting 
In April 2015, Zack began hosting "#NoFilter with Zack Peter," a pop-culture and reality TV news podcast. The show has been covered in a number of media publications and as of October 2022, has been featured on Bravo's Summer House, Vanderpump Rules, and The Real Housewives of Beverly Hills.

In May 2018, Zack began hosting "#Adulting," a wellness and lifestyle podcast with model Nikki Sharp and fashion influencer Abigail Fraher. The show concluded in May 2021. Guests ranged from medical experts like Mark Hyman M.D., Josh Axe D.C., Will Cole D.C., and Mike Varshavski D.O., to health and fitness leaders like trainer Jillian Michaels, Bulletproof founder Dave Asprey, brain coach Jim Kwik and more.

In September 2022, it was announced that Zack joined Spotify's The Ringer network, hosting podcasts for The Ringer Dish and The Ringer Reality TV Podcast.

Published works
 Saving Deets!: A Family's Journey with Autism (2009)
 Saving Deets!: A Family's Journey with Autism, Second Edition (2010)
 Charity Bites!: The Untold Stories of the Dog-Eat-Dog World of Autism Activism (2011)
 When Life Hands You Lemons. . . Throw Them At People! (2012)
 A Shot of Hope: Real Wisdom From a Real Sibling Warrior Providing Real Hope for Autism (2014)

Filmography

Television

Web series

Radio/Podcast

Awards

References

External links 
 Official Website

Living people
21st-century American comedians
Autism activists
1993 births